Denglisch is a term describing the increased use of anglicisms and pseudo-anglicisms in the German language. The term is first recorded from 1965.

The word has been adopted in English in an anglicized form as Denglish, recorded from 1996.

Terminology 
The term is particularly used by language purists in all German-speaking countries to refer to the increasingly strong influx of English or pseudo-English vocabulary (and other features of the language such as grammar and orthography) into German. The standard German reference work Duden defines it as "a pejorative term for German with too many English expressions mixed in."

Other sources use words with aggressive, hostile, or negative connotations to describe it such as "a persistent infiltration", an "invasion", "onslaught", or "attack", or that it is "corrupting the language" or is an "infectious disease".

The term itself is not a standard German word, but an informal portmanteau of Deutsch + English, and gives the same kind of impression in German, as the word Spanglish has in English: i.e., it is well-understood, but it is an informal word for which there is no common equivalent in standard language use.

Other slang terms in German which refer to the same phenomenon include:  ("McGerman"),  ("dumb German"),  (kebab German).

In English there are numerous colloquial portmanteau words. One set is based on the word Deutsch. These include (chronologically) Deutschlisch (first recorded in 1970), Deutlish (1977), Deutschlish (1979) and Dinglish (1990). Another set of terms is based on the word German. These include (chronologically) Germenglish (first recorded 1936), Germanglish (1967), Gerglish (1968), Germish (1972), Germlish (1974), Genglish (1977), Ginglish (1989), Germinglish (1996), and Gernglish (1996).

Criticism 
Some influence of English on German is expected as part of normal language contact. The term Denglisch refers to abundant or excessive use of anglicisms or pseudo-anglicisms in German.

The introduction of English buzzwords peaked during the 1990s and the early 2000s. Since then, the ubiquity of the practice has made it much less fashionable or prestigious, and several commentators have argued against it. Zeit Online (whose title is itself an example of the prevalence of anglicisms in German IT terminology) criticized the ubiquitous use of English in a 2007 article. Although the article acknowledged the risks of excessive linguistic purism, it condemned the fashion of labeling information desks at train stations, formerly simply known as Auskunft, with the anglicism Service Point. The choice of the pseudo-anglicism Brain up! by then-minister for education Edelgard Bulmahn as a campaign slogan in 2004 was highlighted as an extreme case by Die Zeit. Frankfurter Allgemeine satirized this choice at the time of its introduction, and later wrote that even the English-speaking sphere was mocking "German linguistic submissiveness".

Forms of influence 
Words and expressions labeled as Denglisch can come from various sources, including loanwords, calques, anglicisms, pseudo-anglicisms, or adoption of non-native grammar, syntax, or spelling.

Loanwords 

German vocabulary has numerous cases of English loanwords now fully "naturalized" as German words, including full inflection. English had only very limited influence on German before the mid-19th century. Such loanwords as there are mostly concern nautical vocabulary, loaned into Low German (e.g. tank, ultimately from Indo-Aryan; Tanker (tanker (ship)) is early 20th century).

In the 19th century, it was still more common to use loan translation for the vocabulary of industrialisation (Dampfmaschine for "steam engine", Pferdestärke for "horse power", etc.). To some extent, this continued in the early 20th century: Wolkenkratzer for "skyscraper", Kaugummi for "chewing gum", Flutlicht for "flood light", Fernsehen for "television".

English loanwords became more common in the early 20th century. A notable example from this period is Test (ultimately from Old French test "earthen pot"). Test was compatible both with German phonology and orthography so its nature as a loan is not evident.

Early loanwords (19th to early 20th century) often describe garments or foodstuffs: Jumper (19th century), Curry (19th century loan from English, ultimately from Tamil), Pyjama (early 20th century loan from English pyjamas, ultimately from Urdu), Trenchcoat (1920s). Other loanwords are boykottieren "to boycott" (1890s) and Star.

Direct influence of English, especially via US pop culture, became far more pronounced after the end of World War II, with allied-occupied Germany and later by association with 1960s to 1970s US counterculture: Jeep, Quiz, Show, Western, Rock, Hippie, Groupie.

The newest and most prolific wave of anglicisms arose after 1989 with the end of the Cold War and the surge of the "Anglo-Saxon" smack of economic liberalism in continental Europe and the associated business jargon ("CEO" became extremely fashionable in German, replacing traditional terms such as Direktor, Geschäftsführer, Vorsitzender during the 1990s). At the same time, the rapid development of information technology pushed many technical terms from that field into everyday language.

Many of the more recent loans have developed in the spoken language and are still clearly felt to be English words, so their English orthography is retained in written communication, which leads to awkward spellings combining German morphemes with English word stems, as in gebootet ("booted up" of a computer) or gecrasht  or gecrashed ("crashed", of a computer), downgeloadet, gedownloadet or gedownloaded ("downloaded"). They also retain English phonology in many cases, including phonemes that do not exist in Standard German (such as the /eɪ/ in "update").

Pseudo-anglicisms 
A pseudo-anglicism is a word in another language that is formed from English elements and may appear to be English, but is not used by native English speakers.

Adoption of grammar or idioms 
Another form of Denglisch consists of calques of popular English expressions which replace German words and idioms. Common examples are:

Was passierte in 2005? (What happened in 2005?) Formally: Was passierte 2005? or Was passierte im Jahre 2005?

Although this is considered incorrect by many native speakers as it violates German grammar, it can be found even in German newspapers.

Das macht Sinn. (That makes sense.) Formally: Das ergibt Sinn.; Das hat Sinn., or Das ist sinnvoll.
Willkommen zu [unserem Videochannel], properly Willkommen bei ... (although it has been pointed out that combination of "willkommen" with the preposition zu can also be found in German classics).

Orthography 
Another phenomenon is the usage of the possessive construction  's  (generally used in English but also correct in German in sundry cases), often called Deppenapostroph or Idiotenapostroph ("Idiot's apostrophe" or "Idiot's inverted comma") instead of the traditional German constructions. For example, a Denglisch speaker might write Wikipedia's Gestaltung ("Wikipedia's design") instead of either Wikipedias Gestaltung or die Gestaltung der Wikipedia. Less often, it is used incorrectly to mark a plural s (Greengrocers' apostrophe); pluralizing with an apostrophe is correct in Dutch, not in German or English.
 Handy's, Dessou's,
or for adverbial expressions, such as
 montag's (instead of montags, cf. English [on] Mondays).

The apostrophe is also frequently confused with other characters, with stand-alone acute or grave accents being used in its stead.

Denglisch may combine words according to English rules by writing them in succession. According to the Standard German grammar and spelling rules, that is incorrect.
 Reparatur Annahme instead of Reparaturannahme
The first spelling, with two separate words, makes no logical or grammatical connection between the words but simply juxtaposes them. The second combines them into one word, an Annahme (in this case a place where something is received) for Reparaturen (repairs). That is often called Deppenleerstelle, or Deppenleerzeichen which means idiot's space, incorrectly separating parts of a compound word.

Non-translation 
Many words are taken over as is from English, with little or no change in spelling even if it doesn't fit the German orthographic system. One German source laments the presence of Denglisch as an "infectious disease" of "raging anglicitis" in the German language, which manifests as a kind of "hybrid communications medium". It gives as examples the words  events, economy, performance, entertainment, or electronic cash appearing in German.

Some major companies such as Deutsche Bank now conduct much of their business in English, while several departments of the major German telephone company Deutsche Telekom were known as "T-Home" (formerly "T-Com"), "T-Mobile", "T-Online", and "T-Systems".

Reinventing titles for English-language films dubbed into German was once a common practice so, for example, Paul Landres's 1958 Western Man from God's Country became Männer, die in Stiefeln sterben (i.e. Men Who Die with Their Boots on.), while Raoul Walsh's 1941 film 
They Died with Their Boots On became Sein letztes Kommando (His Last Command) or Der Held des Westens (The Hero of the West). Most current American film titles are no longer translated into German, (Ice Age) although they still often receive German appendages like Prometheus – Dunkle Zeichen (Prometheus – Dark Signs) or include puns not present in the original title, such as Clerks – Die Ladenhüter for Clerks – The Shelf-Warmers. Menus of many global fast food chains also usually go partly or completely untranslated: "Double Whopper (formally: Doppel-Whopper) mit leckerem Bacon und Cheddar Cheese."

Advertising language 
Advertising agencies in German-speaking countries have such a need for skills in English that they want ads for new employees to contain plain English such as "Join us". KFC Germany's recruitment slogan is "I Am for Real", and its website shows very heavy use of English coupled with nonstandard German.

German commercials or, more often, written advertisements are likely to use many English terms:

The verb "downloaden" is alleged to have been coined by Microsoft, as there is a native, common German word ("").  Microsoft Windows Update uses the phrase "" ("Download the latest updates") instead of the standard "".  The latest interface guidelines suggest that the term "" should be used again because many users complained.  However, Aktualisierungen (unlike herunterladen) would not be idiomatic German in this usage or would at least have to be explained as Softwareaktualisierungen or Programmaktualisierungen, the former involving the new Anglicism "Software".

The use of ("") has its roots in a commercial name, too. It is related to the handheld Walkie-talkie, a commercial name for the two-way radio transceiver to be transported in a bag, later in hands and so called (""). A correct translation could be (""). Germans used to cite the word ("") as an example of Denglisch.

Advertising in the field of personal hygiene tends to use much English:

Double Action Waschgel
Vitalisierendes Peeling
Energy Creme Q10
Oil Control Gel Creme
Oil Control Waschgel
[brand name] Visibly Clear Anti-Mitesser Peeling
Ariel Sproodles

The same applies to detergents:

Color Waschmittel instead of Buntwaschmittel or Farbwaschmittel
[brand name] Megaperls
[brand name] Oxy-Action

Larger national and international companies based in Germany also use English to describe their services. The television broadcaster ProSieben uses the slogan "We love to entertain you" while Zurich Financial Services advertise with the slogan "Because change happens". The fastest trains run by the German state-owned railway system Deutsche Bahn (German Rail) are named "IC" and "ICE", abbreviations of "Inter City" and "Inter City Express", while information booths are named ServicePoints, first-class waiting areas are referred to as Lounges, and words like Kundendienst (customer service) and Fahrkarte (ticket) are quickly losing out to their respective English counterparts. As an official stance against this rampant use of Denglisch, the Deutsche Bahn in June 2013 issued a directive and glossary of 2200 Anglicisms that should be replaced by their German counterparts.

Sometimes such neologisms also use CamelCase, as in the Deutsche Telekom's newest rates called "Fulltime", "Freetime", "Call Plus" and "Call Time" offering additionally such features as "CountrySelect". They do not even refrain from offering services at certain 'Callshops', using both languages by building a German-style compound, capitalizing it and using two English words in a new context. It has become common for travel agencies to offer "last minute" bookings or manufacturers to adopt "just in time"; perhaps driven by international commerce and economic interests.

The phrase "Test it" is increasingly common as an English phrase idiosyncratic to German, meaning roughly "Try it out". That is thought to have originated with advertising copy for West cigarettes, exhorting consumers to "Test The West".

In popular culture 
 The popular German a cappella group Wise Guys produced a song on their Radio album called "Denglisch", a tongue-in-cheek look at the use of English words in German language. In the song, the lyrics start out mostly German with only a few English words creeping in: "Oh, Herr, bitte gib mir meine Sprache zurück!" (O Lord, please give me my language back!). It progresses to most of the lyrics being English: "O Lord, please gib mir meine Language back". The tune is a parody of My Bonnie Lies over the Ocean.
 In 1985, the famous German poetic songwriter Reinhard Mey recorded "Mey English Song" as a parody on the increasingly frequent playing of English songs on the radio, although the fans "only understand 'railway station'" (literal translation of the German idiom "verstehe nur Bahnhof"; "cannot understand a thing"). In the song, he states, his producer told him, "Well, what do we now for record sell?", urging Mey to sing in English.
 In an episode of the web series Will It Blend? Tom puts a German-English/English-German CD dictionary into his blender. After he finishes blending the dictionary, he says, "Denglish smoke! Don't breathe this!"
 The book I like you – und du? features frequent code-switching between English and German.
 The punk rock band Goldfinger from Los Angeles produced a cover of "99 Luftballons" by Nena for their 2000 album Stomping Ground in which the fourth verse is in German. They also included a "Germish version" of their song Spokesman as a bonus track on their 2002 album Open Your Eyes, containing a mostly German second verse.
 The American Civil War song "I'm Going to Fight Mit Sigel" is sung in English, interspersed with German words, from the point of view of a German-American soldier fighting under General Franz Sigel.

See also 

 Béarlachas
 Dunglish
 Engrish
 False friends
 Franglais
 Language transfer
 List of English words of German origin
 Lübke English
 Macaronic language
 Mixed language

Notes 
Notes

References

Works cited

Further reading
"Germans are speaking Denglish – by borrowing words from us." (Passnotes No 3,401). The Guardian. 25 June 2013.
 Peter Littger: "The Devil lies in the Detail. Lustiges und Lehrreiches über unsere Lieblingsfremdsprache" Kiepenheuer & Witsch, Cologne 2015, . https://www.amazon.de/dp/3462047035
Vasagar, Jeevan. "Deutsche Bahn aims to roll back use of English." The Telegraph. 24 June 2013.
Pidd, Helen. "Mind your language: German linguists oppose influx of English words." The Guardian. Monday 14 March 2011.

External links 
 Denglisch used for truck-driver humour
 Opinion: Desperately Ditching Denglish, a November 2004 article from the Deutsche Welle website
 Denglish definition and citation, from a February 2001 article on a "lexpionage" (lexical espionage) website
 Gayle Tufts, a Berlin-based American performer whose comedy is often based on Denglish.
 Denglish, at Languagehat.com
 Die Deutschen und ihr Englisch. The devil lies in the detail, an April 2015 article from the Der Tagesspiegel website
 Der DEnglische Patient – A column by Peter Littger  (Manager Magazin, 2016)

Macaronic forms of English
German language